Patriot Act with Hasan Minhaj is an American comedy streaming television talk show hosted by Hasan Minhaj that premiered on October 28, 2018, on Netflix and ran until June 28, 2020. It also had all the episodes, exclusives, and deep cuts on its YouTube channel. The series was created by Minhaj and Prashanth Venkataramanujam, both of whom also executive produce alongside Jim Margolis, Michelle Caputo, Shannon Hartman, and Jennie Church-Cooper. With 40 episodes across six seasons, the show has won an Emmy, a Peabody Award, and two Webby Awards. In August 2020, Netflix canceled the series after six seasons.

Premise
Patriot Act with Hasan Minhaj aims to "explore the modern cultural and political landscape with depth and sincerity." In an attempt to separate his show from similar political satire shows, Minhaj said he wanted to create a show that is "timely and timeless."

Production
On March 1, 2018, it was announced that Netflix had given a series order to a new weekly series created by Hasan Minhaj and Prashanth Venkataramanujam for a first season consisting of thirty-two episodes, split into several volumes. Executive producers were expected to include Minhaj, Venkataramanujam, Michelle Caputo, Shannon Hartman, and Jennie Church-Cooper. Production companies involved with the series were slated to consist of Art & Industry and Haven Entertainment. On June 7, 2018, it was reported that Jim Margolis had joined the series as showrunner and an executive producer. On August 9, 2018, it was revealed that the series had been titled Patriot Act with Hasan Minhaj and that it would premiere on October 28, 2018. Volume 3 taped and aired on Netflix in May and June 2019, and Volume 4 was released on August 4. Volume 5 of Patriot Act released on Netflix on November 10, 2019. Volume 6 was due to release on March 29, 2020 but was postponed due to the global COVID-19 pandemic. On August 18, 2020, Netflix canceled the series after six seasons.

Marketing
On October 4, 2018, the first trailer for the series was released.

Episodes

Volume 1 (2018)

Volume 2 (2019)

Volume 3 (2019)

Volume 4 (2019)

Volume 5 (2019)

Volume 6 (2020)

Reception

Critical response
The series has been met with widespread critical acclaim from critics upon its premiere. On the review aggregation website Rotten Tomatoes, the first season of the series holds a 100% approval rating with an average rating of 7.79 out of 10 based on 15 reviews. The website's critical consensus reads, "Patriot Act stands apart from other like-minded comedy shows thanks to Hasan Minhaj's masterful blending of thought and feeling, catharsis and criticism." Metacritic, which uses a weighted average, assigned the series a score of 78 out of 100 based on 4 critics, indicating "generally favorable reviews".

Influence and controversies
In October 2018, a segment of the episode "Saudi Arabia" included reference to offensive language – the term "Negro Blood" – used in an online manual for US troops deployed to Saudi Arabia to describe the indigenous Gulf Arabs of that country. Following the episode's release, U.S. Central Command issued an apology and removed the online manual.

On January 1, 2019, it was reported that the episode "Saudi Arabia" had been removed from Netflix's service in Saudi Arabia after the country's Communications and Information Technology Commission issued a request to the company to take it down over concerns regarding its content, which included criticism of Crown Prince Mohammad bin Salman and the Saudi-led military campaign in Yemen. However, the episode was still available in the country at the time of the report through the show's official YouTube channel.

Patriot Act has also drawn controversy in other countries the show has covered. The March 2019 episode "Indian Elections" covered the 2019 Indian general election, criticized Prime Minister Narendra Modi and his BJP government, interviewed Congress MP Shashi Tharoor, and tackled issues such as Hindu nationalism, the Kashmir conflict, and mob lynchings against Muslim and Dalit minorities. The episode drew controversy in India, among supporters and opponents of Modi's BJP government. The May 2019 episode "Brazil, Corruption and the Rainforest" covered the 2019 Philippine general election, criticized President Rodrigo Duterte, and tackled issues such as the Philippine Drug War. The episode drew controversy in the Philippines among supporters and opponents of Duterte, leading to a response from the Malacañang Palace attacking the show.

The show's influence was recognized by Time Magazine, which included Hasan Minhaj on its list of the 100 most influential people in the world in April 2019. The Daily Show host Trevor Noah described Patriot Act as a "groundbreaking Netflix show."

After the show's cancellation, several producers including Nur Ibrahim Nasreen, Sheila V Kumar, and Amy Zhang claimed to have experienced abuse, mistreatment, and harassment while in the workplace.

Awards and nominations

References

External links

2018 American television series debuts
2020 American television series endings
2010s American late-night television series
2020s American late-night television series
English-language Netflix original programming
Peabody Award-winning television programs
Television productions postponed due to the COVID-19 pandemic
Television shows scored by Ludwig Göransson